A Time to Love is a 2005 film directed by Huo Jianqi. It stars Zhao Wei and Lu Yi. The film is based on a true story.

Cast
Zhao Wei ... Qu Ran
Lu Yi ... Hou Jia
Song Xiaoying ... Hou Jia's mother
Zhang Qian... Quran's father

Reception
Variety called the film "fairly standard Asian romantic fare". Heroic-Cinema.com were more positive and praised the imagery and cinematography of the film, as well as the performance of both Vicki Zhao Wei and Lu Yi. The reviewer for Beyond Hollywood saw Vicki Zhao as the star with Lu Yi playing an "average" role, and criticised the screenwriters for making the secondary characters one-dimensional and uninteresting.

Awards and nominations

References

External links
 

2000s Mandarin-language films
2005 films
Films directed by Huo Jianqi
Chinese romantic drama films

Films with screenplays by Si Wu
2005 romantic drama films